Prince Carl Bernhard of Saxe-Weimar-Eisenach (30 May 1792 – 31 July 1862) was a distinguished soldier, who, in 1815, after the congress of Vienna, became colonel of a regiment in the service of the king of the Netherlands. He fought at the Battle of Quatre Bras and the Battle of Waterloo where he commanded the 2nd Brigade of the 2nd Dutch Division and became a Chief Commander of the Royal Netherlands East Indies Army

Early life
Prince Bernhard, the seventh child of Charles Augustus, Grand Duke of Saxe-Weimar-Eisenach, was born on 30 May 1792 in Weimar. He enlisted in the Prussian army and in 1806 he fought in the army of Hohenlohe-Ingelfingen. By 1809 he had enlisted in the Saxon army and he fought under Marshal Bernadotte at Wagram.

Waterloo campaign
Prince Bernhard's 2nd Brigade of the 2nd Dutch Division (Sedlnitsky) was the first of the Duke of Wellington's forces to arrive at the cross roads of Quatre Bras. Prince Bernhard's brigade (joined later by the 1st Brigade,) held the cross roads at Quatre Bras for almost 24 hours from the late afternoon of 15 June 1815, until about 3 p.m. on the 16 June, preventing Marshal Michel Ney with the left wing  of the French L'Armée du Nord from taking the cross roads before the Duke of Wellington and substantial allied forces arrived to reinforce the 2nd Division and fight the Battle of Quatre Bras. The successful holding action by the two brigades of the Dutch 2nd Division was one of the most important actions by any of the coalition brigades in the whole of the Waterloo Campaign.

At the Battle of Waterloo Prince Bernhard commanded the allied forces holding the farms of Papelotte, Frischermont and La Haie on the extreme left of the Duke of Wellington's line of battle. They were strategically important, not just because if the forces holding these positions gave way then the French could out flank Wellington, but because it was from that direction that Wellington expected and received Prussian support. Though in the course of the battle Durutte’s 4th French Division obtained a temporary foothold in Papelotte, it was never captured

Commander of the Dutch East Indies Army
Bernhard was appointed commander of the Dutch East Indies Army on December 6, 1848 and arrived on April 14, 1849 in Java. Barely a few weeks after his arrival, the commander of the third Balinese expedition, General Andreas Victor Michiels was killed at Kasumba; and Saxe-Weimar offered to the Governor-General to take over the leadership of the expedition, acting according to the rules that had been given to General Michiels. In the winter of 1849 he was promoted to general of the infantry and three years later (1852) he returned to the Netherlands, for his health, after many improvements and having accomplished to restore the East Indies army. He received on October 5, 1853 an honorable retirement.

Later life and family
Prince Bernhard traveled extensively in the United States in 1825–26. A heavily edited account of his travels, Reise seiner Hoheit des Herzogs Bernhard zu Sachsen-Weimar-Eisenach durch Nord-Amerika, was published by the historian Heinrich Luden in 1828. The work was translated into English and published in Philadelphia, also in 1828, as Travels through North America, during the Years 1825 and 1826. A critical edition of the original manuscript became available in 2017. 

In the years after Waterloo, Bernhard distinguished himself as commander of a Dutch Division in the Belgian campaign of 1831 (the Ten Days Campaign), and from 1847 to 1850 held the command of the forces in the Dutch East Indies. He died 21 July 1862 in Liebenstein.

He married Princess Ida of Saxe-Meiningen, daughter of Georg I, Duke of Saxe-Meiningen, on 30 May 1816 in Meiningen.
Prince Bernhard's son, William Augustus Edward, known as Prince Edward of Saxe-Weimar (1823–1902), entered the British army, served with much distinction in the Crimean War, became colonel of the 1st Life Guards, and later a British Field Marshal.

His daughter Amalia married Prince Henry of the Netherlands.

His granddaughter Pauline of Saxe-Weimar-Eisenach (through his son Prince Hermann) married Charles Augustus, Hereditary Grand Duke of Saxe-Weimar-Eisenach.

His residence in Batavia (now Jakarta) was later used for sessions of the Volksraad quasi-legislature of the Dutch East Indies and the Investigating Committee for Preparatory Work for Independence (BPUPK). Now owned by the Indonesian Ministry of Foreign Affairs, it is preserved as the Pancasila Building.

Honours
He received the following orders and decorations:

Ancestry

References

Further reading
 Pierre de Wite
 june/qb.1.pdf The prince of Orange at Quatre Bras and the order of battle of the 2nd Dutch division gives a description of Prince Bernhard's actions at Quatre Bras

 Karl-Bernhard von Sachsen-Weimar-Eisenach. Herzog Bernhard von Sachsen-Weimar-Eisenach: Das Tagebuch der Reise durch Nord-Amerika in den Jahren 1825 und 1826, edited by Walter Hinderer and Alexander Rosenbaum. Stiftung für Romantikforschung LX. Königshausen und Neumann, 2017. 

1792 births
1862 deaths
German military personnel of the Napoleonic Wars
Dutch military commanders of the Napoleonic Wars
Royal Netherlands East Indies Army generals
Military personnel from Weimar
House of Saxe-Weimar-Eisenach
People from Saxe-Weimar-Eisenach
Knights Grand Cross of the Military Order of William
Recipients of the Order of the Netherlands Lion
Grand Croix of the Légion d'honneur
Honorary Knights Grand Cross of the Order of the Bath
Nobility from Weimar
Sons of monarchs